In mathematics, the category of manifolds, often denoted Manp, is the category whose objects are manifolds of smoothness class Cp and whose morphisms are p-times continuously differentiable maps. This is a category because the composition of two Cp maps is again continuous and of class Cp.

One is often interested only in Cp-manifolds modeled on spaces in a fixed category A, and the category of such manifolds is denoted Manp(A). Similarly, the category of Cp-manifolds modeled on a fixed space E is denoted Manp(E).

One may also speak of the category of smooth manifolds, Man∞, or the category of analytic manifolds,  Manω.

Manp is a concrete category

Like many categories, the category Manp is a concrete category, meaning its objects are sets with additional structure (i.e. a topology and an equivalence class of atlases of charts defining a Cp-differentiable structure) and its morphisms are functions preserving this structure. There is a natural forgetful functor
U : Manp → Top
to the category of topological spaces which assigns to each manifold the underlying topological space and to each p-times continuously differentiable function the underlying continuous function of topological spaces. Similarly, there is a natural forgetful functor
U′ : Manp → Set

to the category of sets which assigns to each manifold the underlying set and to each p-times continuously differentiable function the underlying function.

Pointed manifolds and the tangent space functor 
It is often convenient or necessary to work with the category of manifolds along with a distinguished point: Man•p analogous to Top• - the category of pointed spaces. The objects of Man•p are pairs  where  is a manifold along with a basepoint  and its morphisms are basepoint-preserving p-times continuously differentiable maps: e.g.  such that  The category of pointed manifolds is an example of a comma category - Man•p is exactly  where  represents an arbitrary singleton set, and the represents a map from that singleton to an element of Manp, picking out a basepoint.

References

 
 

Manifolds
Manifolds